Snake Island is a small, low-lying island in southeastern Australia. It is part of the Betsey Island Group, lying close to the southeastern coast of Tasmania around Bruny Island, in the D'entrcasteaux channel.

Flora and fauna
Trees on the island include Allocasuarinas and eucalypts.  Pacific gulls have attempted to breed there.

References

Notes

Sources
 Brothers, Nigel; Pemberton, David; Pryor, Helen; & Halley, Vanessa. (2001). Tasmania's Offshore Islands: seabirds and other natural features. Tasmanian Museum and Art Gallery: Hobart. 

Islands of Tasmania